Slatina is a commune located in Suceava County, Western Moldavia, Romania. It is composed of three villages: Găinești, Herla and Slatina.

References

Communes in Suceava County
Localities in Western Moldavia